Lugnet is a large sport complex located in Falun, Sweden. 
58 of the Swedish Sports Confederation's 67 special sports can be practiced there. There are six full sized indoor pitches in the area where everything from dance to association football can be played or performed. There are also two swimming pools (one indoors and one outdoors), a tennis hall, an athletics arena, an ice arena including one indoor ice hockey rink, an outdoor ice hockey rink, a bandy field and a curling hall. Lugnet is also Sweden's national cross-country skiing and ski jumping centre (the Lugnet Hills ski jump) and often hosts one part of the FIS Cross-Country World Cup. Several FIS Nordic World Ski Championships have been organised here (1974, 1993, 2015). The latest one in 2015.

Teams based at Lugnet
IBF Falun - a local floorball team in the national league top division called Svenska Superligan. IBF Falun play their games in the IBF Falun Arena inaugurated in 2005 under the name FaluKuriren Arena, which holds 2,400 spectators. 
Falu BS - The local bandy team also play in the top division called "Elitserien". They play their games at the bandy stadium which holds about 4,000 spectators.
Falun Street Warriors IHC - An inline hockey club which plays games at Lugnet's Ice hockey Arena.

References

External links 

 Centre homepage

Ski stadiums in Sweden
Buildings and structures in Dalarna County
Sport in Falun
Sports venues in Sweden